Qaanaaq Airport  is an airport located  northwest of Qaanaaq, a settlement in the Avannaata municipality in northern Greenland. It was established in 1991 to serve Qaanaaq and neighboring communities because Thule Air Base in Pituffik is not open for regular passenger traffic. It is the only civilian airport north of Upernavik and is a lifeline for northern Greenland. Fresh food and other consumer products are transported by air.

Airlines and destinations

Air Greenland operates government contract flights to villages in the Qaanaaq region. These mostly cargo flights are not featured in the timetable, although they can be pre-booked. Departure times for these flights as specified during booking are by definition approximate, with the settlement service optimized on the fly depending on local demand for a given day.

Travel from south Greenland to Qaanaaq include plane changes at Ilulissat and Upernavik. Travel from other countries include plane changes in Copenhagen, Kangerlussuaq, Ilulissat and Upernavik, or Reykjavik, Ilulissat and Upernavik.

Transfers at Thule Air Base 
Travellers bound for Thule Air Base in Pituffik are required to apply for transfer permit from either Rigsombudsmanden in Nuuk (residents of Greenland), or the Danish Foreign Ministry (all others). Failure to present the permit during check-in results in denial of boarding. The same rules apply for transfers at Pituffik, including a stopover on the way from Qaanaaq to Savissivik. Travel from Upernavik (with connections from southwest Greenland) to Qaanaaq is not influenced.

References

Airports in Greenland
Airports in the Arctic